ManSound (Ukrainian "МенСаунд") - is a vocal sextet, founded in 1994 in Kiev (Ukraine). ManSound took part to more than 50 jazz festivals, performed three times at the Lionel Hampton Jazz Festival in the United States. The All American Entertainment Awards nominated ManSound as best vocal group in 2001. In 2002 ManSound won the First Prize at the international competition for a cappella groups Vokal Total. In 2004 the Contemporary A Cappella Society (CASA) awarded the famous jazz standard arranged by Vladimir Mikhnovetsky Best Vocal Performance in the world in the style of jazz.

Members 
 Volodymyr Sukhin - tenor
 Ruben Tolmachev - bass
 Yuri Romensky - tenor
 Vyacheslav Rubel - baritone
 Serhiy Kharchenko - tenor
 Vilen Kilchenko - tenor

Discography 
 Slavic Roots (2003)
 If It's Magic (2004)
 Himn Ukrayiny (Гімн України) (2006)
 Joy to the World (2006)
 Pid Oblachkom (Під облачком) (2007)
 VOYAGE (2008)
 Acapellissimo (2012)

Sources 
 Official Website

Ukrainian musical groups